The Puerto Rico national football team represents Puerto Rico in men's international football, and are governed by the Federación Puertorriqueña de Fútbol (FPF). The team's nickname is El Huracán Azul meaning The Blue Hurricane. They are members of the Caribbean Football Union, and part of CONCACAF. The team has never qualified for the FIFA World Cup or the CONCACAF Gold Cup.

History

1940–1990
Puerto Rico's first international match was against Cuba in 1940 in which they drew 1–1. They did not record a win until a 3–0 result in 1970 against the Bahamas. In 1972, Puerto Rico recorded a 1–0 win against Panama in a friendly. Wins between the 1980s and 1990s were mainly against the Bahamas, the Dominican Republic, and Martinique.

Chris Armas years (1993–1994)
Chris Armas played for Puerto Rico in the 1993 Caribbean Cup. In the tournament, Puerto Rico established a 4-game win streak without conceding a goal. The competition was not then recognized by FIFA, and so his five matches were considered friendlies. As a result, he was later allowed to switch his allegiance to the United States, for whom he has since been capped over 50 times.

1995–2007
Between 1995 and 2007 Puerto Rico did not record a win, and had only four draws. During this time, the team dropped down in the FIFA Rankings to 202nd.

2008–2015

Over the past few years, Puerto Rico has begun to emerge as a contender, like they were in the 1990s. In 2008, they won two games as visitors against Bermuda (1–0 and 2–0), drew 2–2 with Trinidad and Tobago. They also won for the first time since 1994 when they beat the Dominican Republic in the first round of the World Cup qualifiers. Although they lost the first leg 4–0 to Honduras, they fought a 2–2 tie in the home leg in the second round. The Puerto Rican Football Federation has announced plans that would allow them to participate in the next editions of the Caribbean Cup and Gold Cup. Most capped player Andres Cabrero is the only active player as of 2021 who participated in said 2010 World Cup qualifiers.

Puerto Rico was supposed to make their debut in the 21st Central American and Caribbean Games in 2010 on home soil in Mayagüez, but due to the controversy of CONCACAF not approving the stadiums, the team couldn't compete in the football event. The team was supposed to play in Venezuela instead but due to the lack of teams, the male event was canceled.

Puerto Rico faced World and European champion Spain in a friendly on 15 August 2012, losing 2–1 in the Juan Ramón Loubriel Stadium in Bayamón, Puerto Rico.

On 5 June 2015, Puerto Rico played a friendly against Bermuda, their last friendly before the qualifiers for the 2018 World Cup ending in a 1–1 draw. After losing to Grenada 2–1 in the second round of the 2018 World Cup qualifiers, Puerto Rico's Interim coach Jose 'Cukito' Martinez resigned and a few days later, the Uruguayan Carlos Avedissian solved his visa problems and could finally arrive as the head coach of the national team. On 11 December 2015, Puerto Rico played a friendly against MLS team New York City, losing 2–1.

2016–2017

Carlos Avedissian / Jack Stefanowski era
Carlos Avedissian took charge of the team in 2015 forming a roster mainly of players from the Puerto Rico local leagues. On 22 May 2016, Puerto Rico played a friendly match against the United States for the first time ever ending in a 3–1 loss. For discrepancies with the Federation, Avedissian was substituted by Jack Stefanowski for the second round on an interim basis. With this team mainly of local players, Puerto Rico advanced for the first time to the third round of the 2017 Caribbean Cup qualification when they defeated Grenada and Antigua and Barbuda in the second round, only two games away from reaching the CONCACAF Gold Cup for the first time. Stefanowski had to leave the technical director position because he was an assistant for Puerto Rico FC.

On 3 September 2016, Puerto Rico faced India for the first time in an international friendly match at the Mumbai Football Arena, but were defeated in the contest 1–4.

Carlos García Cantarero era
After Stefanowski left the team to continue with Puerto Rico FC, Carlos Cantarero assumed as head coach of the national team with Jose Cukito Martinez (who had coached most of the local players in the Puerto Rico League) as assistant coach. The team played three friendlies, two against the Dominican Republic and one against India, prior to the third round matches against Antigua and Barbuda and Curaçao. Coach Cantarero couldn't coach in the friendlies due to visa problems. After the second friendly against the Dominican Republic Assistant Coach Martinez left the team prior to the trip to India and David Guillemat assumed the position. Regardless of the administrative debacle, and coaching changes, Puerto Rico lost the decisive match against Curaçao after being 2–0 up front for which Curaçao as head of group advanced to the Gold Cup.

Puerto Rico didn't play an international match until the summer of 2017 when they played to a scoreless draw against Indonesia.

After the devastation of Hurricane Maria in September that left the entire island powerless. On 7 October it was reported MLS club, Orlando City SC announced a Fuerza Puerto Rico’ Friendly for 4 November with all the net proceeds from the match going towards the United for Puerto Rico initiative to raise funds and aid recovery efforts for the island. Reactivating the national team for a 3rd time this year. The friendly marked Orlando City’s last game of 2017, as well team captain, Kaká with the lions. Puerto Rico lost the exhibition match 6–1.

2018
In May 2018, the Puerto Rican Football Federation announced that Carlos Cantarero would no longer continue as head coach of the national team, with former Honduran player Amado Guevara taking over as head coach.

Team image

Kit suppliers

Schedule and results

The following is a list of match results in the last 12 months, as well as any future matches that have been scheduled.

2022

2023

Coaching staff

Coaching history
Caretaker managers are listed in italics.

  Eduardo Ordóñez Munguira (1959)
  Raúl Marchant González (1966)
  Egberto Morales Carrasco (1972)
 / Luis Villarejo (1974–1975)
  Carlos Martinolli (1978–1979)
  Joe Serralta (1979–1982)
  Juan "Saso" Tullier (1982–1984)
  Ricardo "Richie" Romano (1985–1990)
  Víctor Hugo Barros (1990–1991)
  Arnie Ramirez (1992)
  Oscar Rosa (1992)
  Cristóbal Vaccaro (1996)
  José Luis "Majo" Rodríguez (1999)
  Raimundo Gatinho (2000)
  Toribio Rojas (2002–2003)
  Víctor Hugo Barros (2004)
  Colin Clarke (2007–2011)
  Jack Stefanowski (2011)
  Adrian Whitbread (2011)
  Jeaustin Campos (2011–2013)
  Víctor Hugo Barros (2013–2014)
  Jose Martinez (2015)
  Carlos Avedissian (2015–2016)
  Jack Stefanowski (2016)
  Carlos García Cantarero (2016–2018)
  Amado Guevara (2018–2019)
  Elgy Morales (2019–2021)
  Dave Sarachan (2021–present)

Players

Current squad
The following 24 players were called up to the squad for the 2022–23 CONCACAF Nations League matches against British Virgin Islands and Cayman Islands on 9 and 12 June 2022, respectively.

Caps and goals correct as of 12 June 2022, after the match against Cayman Islands.

Recent call-ups 
The following players have been called up within the last 12 months.

  WD 

  PRE 
  PRE 
  WD 

  WD 
  PRE 
  PRE 

Notes
INJ = Withdrew due to injury
PRE = Preliminary squad / standby
RET = Retired from the national team
SUS = Serving suspension
WD = Player withdrew from the squad due to non-injury issue.

Records

Players in bold are still active with Puerto Rico.

Most capped players

Top goalscorers

Competitive record

FIFA World Cup

CONCACAF Gold Cup

CONCACAF Nations League

CFU Caribbean Cup

Pan American Games

See also

 Puerto Rico national under-20 football team
 Puerto Rico national under-17 football team
 Football in Puerto Rico

References

External links
 Official website 
 Puerto Rico FIFA profile
 Puerto Rico List of International Matches at RSSSF.com

 
Caribbean national association football teams